The Standard E1 was a motorized freight tricycle, produced from 1939 to 1945 by the Standard vehicle factory of Wilhelm Gutbrod, Germany. It was an identical construction of  the Tempo E 400 by Tempowerk Vidal & Sohn, built from 1938 to 1948, the design was taken as Hitler's "Standard Three-wheeler Delivery Van" (Einheits-Dreirad-Lieferwagen). It had a simple chain drive from gearbox and engine  to the front wheel below. This simple construction with a lifted center of gravity was less stable when cornering. So far former vehicle designs by Gutbrod had the engine and gearbox located behind the rear axle as an underfloor engine.

During World War II, manufacturers were obliged by the Nazi regime dictatorship to produce weapons and accessories as well as military equipment for the war. Only a few manufacturers were allowed to continue production of civil vehicles. It was the last freight tricycle built by Gutbrod. The coachbuilder Rometsch was forced to produce field kitchens, competitor Borgward produced military vehicles and least after the war the freight tricycle production was continued by its successor model.

Further reading
 Werner Oswald: German Cars: 1920 - 1945, Motorbuch Verlag, 2019,

References

Front-wheel-drive vehicles
Vehicles introduced in 1938